The 19th Congress of the Philippines, composed of the Philippine Senate and House of Representatives, convened on July 25, 2022. The 19th Congress is meeting during the first three years of Bongbong Marcos's presidency, and will end on June 4, 2025. The convening of the 19th Congress followed the 2022 general elections, which replaced half of the Senate membership and the entire membership of the House of Representatives.

The House of Representatives continues to meet in the Batasang Pambansa Complex. The Senate currently meets in the GSIS Building, with a scheduled move in 2024 to its new building in Navy Village, Taguig. The 19th Congress is also the first since the 10th Congress that no senator is from the Liberal Party.

Leadership

Senate 

Senate President:
Migz Zubiri (Independent), July 25, 2022 – present
Senate President pro tempore:
Loren Legarda (NPC), July 25, 2022 – present
Majority Floor Leader: 
Joel Villanueva (Independent), July 25, 2022 – present
Minority Floor Leader:
Koko Pimentel (PDP–Laban), July 25, 2022 – present

House of Representatives 

 Speaker:
Martin Romualdez (Leyte–1st, Lakas), July 25, 2022 – present
 Deputy Speakers:
Senior Deputy Speaker Gloria Macapagal Arroyo (Pampanga–2nd, Lakas), July 25, 2022 – present
Isidro Ungab (Davao City–3rd, Lakas), July 25, 2022 – present
Roberto Puno (Antipolo–1st, NUP), July 25, 2022 – present
Camille Villar (Las Piñas–Lone, Nacionalista), July 25, 2022 – present
Kristine Singson-Meehan (Ilocos Sur–2nd, NPC), July 25, 2022 – present
Raymond Democrito Mendoza (party-list, TUCP), July 25, 2022 – present
Ralph Recto (Batangas–6th, Nacionalista), July 27, 2022 – present
Aurelio Gonzales Jr. (Pampanga–3rd, PDP–Laban), July 27, 2022 – present
Vincent Franco Frasco (Cebu–5th, NUP), July 27, 2022 – present
Majority Floor Leader: 
Manuel Jose Dalipe (Zamboanga City–2nd, Lakas), July 25, 2022 – present
Sandro Marcos (Ilocos Norte–1st, Nacionalista)
Minority Floor Leader:
Marcelino Libanan (party-list, 4Ps), July 26, 2022 – present
Bernadette Hererra-Dy (party-list, Bagong Henerasyon)

Sessions 
 First regular session: July 25, 2022 – June 2, 2023
 July 25, 2022–September 30, 2022
 November 7, 2022–December 16, 2022
 January 23, 2023–March 24, 2023
 May 8, 2023–June 2, 2023
 Second regular session: July 24, 2023 – June 22, 2024

Members

Senate

Notes

House of Representatives 

Terms of members of the House of Representatives started on June 30, 2022, took office on July 25, and will end on June 30, 2025, unless stated otherwise.

District representatives 

Notes

Party-list representatives 

Notes

Changes in membership

Senate

House of Representatives

District representatives

Party-list representatives

Constitutional bodies

References 

Congresses of the Philippines
Fifth Philippine Republic